Athyrium americanum, the american alpine lady fern, is a species of fern in the family Aspleniaceae. It is native to the Russian Far East, subarctic North America, and the west to west-central United States. It occurs at higher altitudes and latitudes than Athyrium filix-femina, the common lady fern.

References

americanum
Flora of Sakhalin
Flora of the Kuril Islands
Flora of Magadan Oblast
Flora of Kamchatka Krai
Flora of Alaska
Flora of Yukon
Flora of British Columbia
Flora of Alberta
Flora of Quebec
Flora of Labrador
Flora of Newfoundland
Flora of Greenland
Flora of the Northwestern United States
Flora of California
Flora of Nevada
Flora of Utah
Plants described in 1919